Notulu is a name shared by several noblewomen of Barotseland in Africa.

Queen Notulu 
Notulu I was queen consort as a wife of King Ngombala of the Lozi people. She was starved to death by one of his successors, King Mwananyanda Liwale. Her father was named Mwiyawamatende.

Chieftess Notulu 
Notulu II of Libumbwandinde was a chieftess. She was the daughter of King Ngombala and the queen mentioned above, her namesake. She was also a sister of the Prince Mbanga, mother of the Chief Mukwangwa and aunt of the king Mwanawina I.

Princess Notulu 
Notulu III was a princess consort as a wife of Mbanga (mentioned above). Thus both the sister and the wife of Prince Mbanga had the same name and they were sisters-in-law.

Her children were:
King Yubya
Chief Nakambe, 3rd Chief of Nalolo
Mwanamalia, 4th Chief of Nalolo
Yubya II, 2nd Chief of Nalolo
Prince Nakambe
King Mwanawina I

References

Royalty of Barotseland
19th-century African people
Princesses by marriage
African queen mothers
African queens
African princesses